Maytha Alhassen is a Syrian-American journalist who appears regularly as a guest co-host and digital producer on the English-language television current-events program The Stream on Al Jazeera. Alhassen has appeared on CNN, HuffPost Live, Fusion Network, The Young Turks, and WNYC's The Brian Lehrer Show. Along with Ahmed Shihab-Eldin, Alhassen is the editor of Demanding Dignity: Young Voices from the Front Lines of the Arab Revolutions, published in 2012.

Alhassen has also written for CNN, Huffington Post, Mic and Counterpunch. In addition, she appeared at South by Southwest in 2012. Previously, Alhassen co-hosted an Arab-American TV variety show called What's Happening.

Alhassen received her doctorate at the  University of Southern California Dornsife's Department of American Studies and Ethnicity. She received her bachelor's degree in political science and Arabic and Islamic studies from the UCLA in 2004 and her master's degree in anthropology from Columbia University in 2008. While at Columbia, Alhassen conducted research for the university's Malcolm X Project.

References

External links 
 

Living people
American people of Syrian descent
American women journalists
American writers of Syrian descent
Al Jazeera people
University of Southern California alumni
University of California, Los Angeles alumni
Columbia Graduate School of Arts and Sciences alumni
1982 births